Ricardo Santana Jr. (born November 19, 1992, in Panama) is a jockey in American Thoroughbred racing who won six consecutive riding titles from 2013 through 2018 at Oaklawn Park and in 2019 won the Breeders' Cup Sprint as well as the Prince of Wales Stakes (2019), the second leg of the Canadian Triple Crown series.

From the El Chorrillo neighborhood in Panama City, Ricardo Santana Jr. graduated in December 2008 from the Laffit Pincay Jr. training school for jockeys. In 2009 he immigrated to the United States where he would get his first win on September 21 at Delaware Park Racetrack. He earned his first Grade I win aboard Creator in the 2016 Arkansas Derby.

References

1992 births
Living people
American jockeys
American sportspeople of Panamanian descent
Panamanian emigrants to the United States